Ardmore is a small village in the north east of the Isle of Barra in the Outer Hebrides, Scotland.

In 2002 a small ferry port was built in the village to serve a new ferry link between Barra and Eriskay as part of the Sound of Barra Integrated Transport Project.  The ferry service started in spring 2003.  A causeway had previously been built linking Eriskay to South Uist. The daily service on the MV Loch Alainn has frequent sailings; the crossing takes approximately 40 minutes. Since 2016, when the Oban–Lochboisdale service ceased, it is the only ferry between Barra and South Uist.

Note that the correct location for the port is as follows, rather than at Aird Mhidhinis as shown on some printed Ordnance Survey maps.

See also
 List of lighthouses in Scotland
 List of Northern Lighthouse Board lighthouses

References

External links

Villages on Barra